Toivo Nestori Aro (born Toivo Nestori Ahlstedt, 9 February 1887 – 8 October 1962) was a Finnish sportsleader and an aquatics athlete, who won 10 Finnish championships.

Sports

Olympic participation 

Aro was the Chef de Mission of Finland at the 1928 Winter Olympics. He was the leader of Finland's swimming team at the 1924 and 1936 Summer Olympics. In 1924 he was also a diving judge.

National athlete 

Aro won ten Finnish national championship golds in aquatics:
 plain diving: 1907, 1910, 1911 and 1912
 platform diving: 1910 and 1912
 water polo: 1909, 1911, 1913
 4 × 50 metre freestyle relay: 1907

He was a member of eight clubs, all Helsinki-based:
 Helsingfors Simsällskap. Board member in 1913–1915. Honorary member since 1937.
 Helsingin Hiihtäjät. Founding member.
 Helsingin Itäreitin Melojat. Founding member.
 Helsingin Luistelijat. Founding member.
 Helsingin Uimarit. Founding and honorary member.
 Norssin Turnarit
 Suomalainen Pursiseura. Honorary member.
 Ylioppilasvoimistelijat

Sportsleader 

Aro was a board member of the International Ski Federation in 1926–1930.

He was a board member of Finnish Olympic Committee in 1919–1946 and its treasurer in 1929–1957.

He was the chairman of the Finnish Swimming Federation in 1928–1946 and its honorary chairman.

He was the progenitor of the Yrjönkatu Swimming Hall, the first public indoor swimming hall in Finland.

He was the founding member of Suomen Latu, a national non-profit organisation for the promotion of outdoor recreation and a physical activies, and its inaugural chairman in 1938.

He was active in many other notable Finnish sport organizations in the 1920s and 1930s.

Other 

Aro was born and died in Helsinki. His parents were Henrik Gustav Aro Ahlstedt and Mariaana Karoliina Forsell. They finnicized their family name from Ahlstedt to Aro on 12 May 1906.

He married dentist Katri Lille (1890–) in 1916. They had six children:
 Toivo Ilmari (1917–), who acted in various positions in sport in Finland
 Uhmo Antamo (1919–)
 Kauko Kalervo (1920–1932)
 Sorri Uskali (1922–)
 Heljä Iloisa Katri (1926–), who married Yrjö Heikki Soininvaara (born Sirén) (1924–) in 1948. Osmo Soininvaara is their son.
 Marja Terttu Tellervo (1928–)

He was the chief executive officer of the bank Helsingin Suomalainen Säästöpankki in 1925–1957.

He was the editor-in-chief of Urheilulehti in 1917–1918. He wrote some works, such as a fifty-year history of Helsingin Suomalainen Säästöpankki, banking-related manuals, sport and temperance movement histories.

He was awarded the Knight of the White Rose of Finland. His wife received the Commemorative medal of the Winter War.

References 

1887 births
1962 deaths
Finnish male divers
Olympic divers of Finland
Divers at the 1908 Summer Olympics
Divers at the 1912 Summer Olympics
Finnish bankers
Finnish editors